The Aristides Stakes is a Grade III American Thoroughbred horse race for three-year-olds and older over a distance of six furlongs on the dirt held annually in early June at Churchill Downs in Louisville, Kentucky. . The race currently offers a purse of $100,000.

History
The Aristides Stakes is named in honor of the racehorse Aristides who won the inaugural Kentucky Derby in 1875 on the Churchill Downs track.

The race itself was inaugurated in 1989 and run at a distance of  furlongs.

Bet on Sunshine, the only two-time winner in the race's history, set a new track record of 1:15.11 for  furlongs in 2000 then in 2001 beat his own record with a time of 1:14.79. At its current six-furlong distance, Kelly's Landing ran the fastest six furlongs in Churchill Downs history when he won the 2005 edition in a time of 1:07.59.

Winners since 1989

References

 Breeders Cup.com article on the 2007 Aristides Breeders' Cup Stakes

Graded stakes races in the United States
Open sprint category horse races
Churchill Downs horse races
1989 establishments in Kentucky
Recurring sporting events established in 1989
Grade 3 stakes races in the United States